Mayuge Solar Power Station, also Bufulubi Solar Power Station, is an operational   solar power plant in Uganda.

Location

Overview
Application has been made to the Electricity Regulatory Authority (ERA) to set up the plant and sell the power to Uganda Electricity Transmission Company Limited for integration into the national electric grid.

The power station comprises 30,600 sun-tracking pv panels, which track the sun to maximize power output. The power generated is enough to supply 30,000 homes.

Developers and funding
The construction, which cost US$11 million (USh41 billion), was funded by Tryba Energy, a French family industrial group dedicated to solar energy. Tryba Energy has secured a 20-year lease of 100 acres of land from the Busoga Kingdom, while an application was made to the Electricity Regulatory Authority (ERA) to set up the plant and sell the power to Uganda Electricity Transmission Company Limited (UETCL) for integration into the national grid.

Timeline
The completed power station was commissioned on Thursday, 6 June 2019. At that time, Uganda' grid had a total contribution of 50 megawatts, from solar plants, including Soroti Solar Power Station (10 megawatts), Tororo Solar Power Station (10 megawatts) and Kabulasoke Solar Power Station (20 megawatts).

Other considerations
The energy generated here is sold to the Uganda Electricity Transmission Company Limited (UETCL), for integration into the national grid. UETCL pays US$0.11 for every kilo Watthour of energy, under a long-term power purchase agreement.

See also

List of power stations in Uganda
Energy in Uganda

References

External links
 Uganda’s solar attracts investors amid cost fears

Solar power stations in Uganda
Mayuge District
Eastern Region, Uganda
Energy infrastructure in Uganda